Marloes is a village in Pembrokeshire, Wales.

Marloes may also refer to:

Places 
Marloes Sands, a remote sandy beach in Pembrokeshire, Wales, near the village of Marloes 
Marloes Mere, a lake near Marloes

People 
Marloes is a Dutch feminine given name.
Marloes Braat (born 1990), Dutch cricket player
Marloes Coenen (born 1982), Dutch mixed martial artist
Marloes de Boer (born 1982), Dutch football defender
Marloes Fellinger (born 1982), Dutch softball player
Marloes Horst (born 1989), Dutch fashion model
Marloes Keetels (born 1993), Dutch field hockey player
Marloes Maathuis (born 1978), Dutch statistician
Marloes Wesselink (born 1987), Dutch beach volleyball player
Marloes Wittenberg (born 1983), Dutch judoka

Other 
 Marloes and St Brides, a community council in the West Wales county of Pembrokeshire

See also
 

Dutch feminine given names